Lieutenant General Hamid Gul  (‎; 20 November 1936 – 15 August 2015) was a three-star rank army general in the Pakistan Army and defence analyst. Gul was notable for serving as the Director-General of the Inter-Services Intelligence (ISI), Pakistan's premier intelligence agency, between 1987 and 1989. During his tenure, Gul played an instrumental role in directing ISI support to Afghan resistance groups against Soviet forces in return for funds and weapons from the US, during the Soviet–Afghan War, in co-operation with the CIA.

In addition, Gul was widely credited for expanding covert support to Kashmiri Terrorist groups against neighbouring rival India in the disputed Kashmir region from 1989, diverting focus from the fallout of the Soviet war. Gul earned a reputation as a "Godfather" of Pakistani geostrategic policies. For his role against India, he has been considered by A. S. Dulat, former director of RAW, as "the most infamous ISI chief in Indian eyes." Following an escalation of the Kashmir militancy in India and the Taliban insurgency in Afghanistan, he was even accused by the United States and India of having ties to Islamic terrorist groups,  notably Al-Qaeda and the Lashkar-e-Taiba.

In 1988 Gul also played a role in the creation of the IJI, a conservative political alliance formed to oppose the PPP of Prime Minister Benazir Bhutto.

On 15 August 2015, he died after suffering a brain haemorrhage.

Early life
Hamid Gul was born on 20 November 1936 in Sargodha in the Punjab Province of British India (now in Punjab, Pakistan) into a family of Yusufzai Pashtuns to parents Muhammad Khan and his wife from Buner Tehsil, Swat District. He got his early education from a school in his village. He received admission into Government College Lahore, before being admitted to Pakistan Military Academy Kakul

Army career
Hamid Gul was commissioned in the Pakistan Army in October 1956 with the 18th PMA Long Course in the 19th Lancers regiment of the Armoured Corps. He was a squadron commander during the 1965 war with India. He attended the Command and Staff College Quetta in 1968–69. During 1972–1976, Gul directly served under General Muhammad Zia-ul-Haq as a battalion commander, and then as Staff Colonel, when General Zia was GOC, 1st Armoured Division and Commander II Corps at Multan. Thus, Gul had already cemented his ties with General Zia by serving under him when both were officers in the Armoured regiments of the II Corps. Gul was promoted to Brigadier in 1978 and steadily rose to be the Martial Law Administrator of Bahawalpur and then the Commander of the 1st Armoured Division, Multan in 1982, his appointments expressly wished by Zia himself.

Gul was then sent to GHQ as the Director-General or DG Military Intelligence (DGMI) under General Muhammad Zia-ul-Haq who then nominated him to be the ISI chief succeeding General Akhtar Abdur Rahman in March 1987. He was later replaced as the ISI commander by PM Benazir Bhutto in May 1989 and Gul was transferred as the commander, II Corps in Multan. In this capacity, Gul conducted the Zarb-e-Momin military exercise in November–December 1989, the biggest Pakistani Armed Forces show of muscle since 1971 Indo-Pakistani War.

General Asif Nawaz upon taking the reins of Pakistan Army in August 1991, had transferred Gul as the DG Heavy Industries Taxila. A menial job compared to Gul's stature, Gul refused to take the assignment, an act for which he was retired from the army.

Director-General of the ISI(1987–1989)

Afghanistan and the Soviet war

During his time as head of the ISI amid the Soviet–Afghan War, Gul was said to have planned and executed the operation to capture Jalalabad from the Soviet-backed Afghan army in the spring of 1989. This switch to conventional warfare was seen as a mistake by some since the mujahideen did not have the capacity to capture a major city, and the battle did not yield expected ground results. However, the Pakistani army was intent on installing a resistance-backed government in Afghanistan, with Jalalabad as their provisional capital, Abdul Rasul Sayyaf as Prime Minister, and Gulbuddin Hekmatyar as Foreign Minister.

Contrary to Pakistani expectations, this battle proved that the Afghan army could fight without Soviet help, and greatly increased the confidence of government supporters. Conversely, the morale of the mujahideen involved in the attack slumped and many local commanders of Hekmatyar and Sayyaf concluded truces with the government. In the words of Brigadier Mohammad Yousef, an officer of the ISI, "the jihad [meaning the plans for Hekmatyar to be installed as prime minister] never recovered from Jalalabad". As a result of this failure, Hamid Gul was sacked by Pakistani Prime Minister Benazir Bhutto and replaced by Shamsur Rahman Kallu, who pursued a more classical policy of support to the rebels fighting in Afghanistan.

Domestic politics
During his tenure as ISI chief in 1988, General Gul successfully gathered conservative politicians and helped them create IJI, a centre-right conservative coalition united against the left-leaning PPP. Gul later acknowledged his role in IJI's formation in various interviews for which he was harshly rebuked in one of the editorials of a major Pakistani newspaper, which asked the general to apologise first to the PPP for having done so and after that, apologising for a lack of intelligence because the IJI could not maintain its two-thirds majority for long.

Kashmir and India

According to accusations by Indian commentator B Raman, Gul actively backed Khalistani militants. "When Bhutto became prime minister in 1988", Raman says, "Gul justified backing these insurgents as the only way of pre-empting a fresh Indian threat to Pakistan's territorial integrity. When she asked him to stop playing that card, he reportedly told her: Madam, keeping Punjab destabilized is equivalent to the Pakistan army having an extra division at no cost to the taxpayers." "Gul strongly advocated supporting indigenous Kashmiri groups", adds Raman, "but was against infiltrating Pakistani and Afghan mercenaries into Jammu and Kashmir. He believed Pakistan would play into India's hands by doing so."

Pan-Islamism
Even if the ISI, under General Akhtar Abdur Rahman, was already aiming beyond the region, for instance establishing contacts with jihadi groups like the Abu Sayyaf in the Philippines, it was under Hamid Gul that the ISI took a definitely pan-Islamist turn, as he not only wished for a Pakistan-led Islamic coalition against India, in his own words "a strategic depth concept that links Pakistan, Iran, Turkey, and Afghanistan in an alliance" which "would be a jeweled Mughal dagger pointed at the Hindu heart", but also called for what he perceived as the liberation of persecuted Muslim groups all over the world, such as the Eritreans, Bosniaks, Rohingyas, Uzbeks and Uighurs.

At the time of his death, journalist Abbas Nasir, while offering a critical review of his life and career, said that "commitment to jihad - to an Islamic revolution transcending national boundaries, was such that he dreamed one day the "green Islamic flag" would flutter not just over Pakistan and Afghanistan, but also over territories represented by the (former Soviet Union) Central Asian republics."

Post-Soviet war fallout
General Gul worked closely with the CIA during the Soviet occupation of Afghanistan, when he was the ISI head. However, he became dispassionate with the United States after it turned its back on Afghanistan following the 1989 Soviet withdrawal, as the United States had promised to help build a prosperous Afghanistan. He was further disconcerted when the US began punishing Pakistan with economic and military sanctions for its secret nuclear program. General Gul then went on to declare that "the Muslim world must stand united to confront the U.S. in its so-called War on Terrorism, which is in reality a war against Muslims. Let's destroy America wherever its troops are trapped."

General Gul personally met Osama Bin Laden in 1993 and refused to label him a terrorist unless and until irrefutable evidence was provided linking him to alleged acts of terrorism. Only days after the September 11 attacks, Gul also stated his belief that the attacks were "clearly an inside job".

Post-retirement career
According to Zahid Hussain, in his book Frontline Pakistan, Lt. Gen. Hamid Gul and former Army chief General Mirza Aslam Beg were part of the 9 January 2001 Darul Uloom Haqqania Islamic conference held near Peshawar, which was also attended by 300 leaders representing various Islamic groups. The meeting declared it a religious duty of Muslims all over the world to protect the government of the Islamic Emirate of Afghanistan, and the Saudi dissident Osama bin Laden it was hosting, whom they considered as a 'great Muslim warrior.'

On 12 March 2007, Gul marched alongside activists from the liberal democratic parties and retired former senior military officers against General Pervez Musharraf. General Gul faced down riot police when they tried to arrest him at a rally outside the Supreme Court in Islamabad protesting against attempts to dismiss Chief Justice Iftikhar Muhammad Chaudhry.

He turned against the restored Supreme Court chief justice after a bench allowed Musharraf to contest the elections in uniform.

Days after the 2007 Karachi bombings, Benazir Bhutto in a letter to President Musharaf written on 16 October 2007 named Hamid Gul as one of the four persons including the current Intelligence Bureau (IB) Chief Ijaz Shah, the then chief minister of Punjab Chaudhry Pervaiz Elahi, then chief minister of Sindh Arbab Ghulam Rahim, she suspected were behind the attacks. Gul responded furiously to these claims. He was arrested on 4 November by the military police in Islamabad during President Pervez Musharraf's declared state of emergency.

Gul acknowledged his affiliation with Ummah Tameer-e-Nau. United States government prompted Gul's name in a list of 4 former ISI officers for inclusion in the list of international terrorists that was sent to UN Secretary General, but China refused.

In 2008 Gul was informed by a senior official in Pakistan's Foreign Ministry that he had been placed on a U.S. watch list of "global terrorists", along with several others. He was shown a U.S. document that detailed several charges against him, including allegations that he had ties to al-Qaeda and the Taliban. Gul rejected these allegations. On 14 December 2008, President Asif Ali Zardari in an interview with Newsweek described Hamid Gul as a "political ideologue" of terror rather than a physical supporter.
According to the Daily Telegraph, following the death of Osama bin Laden, Gul opined that US forces had killed him in Afghanistan and moved the body to Abbottabad to humiliate Pakistan.

Family
His father was a farmer who served in the British Army. He was survived by his wife, who died in October 2019. He has two sons Umar and Abdullah and a daughter Uzma. His son Abdullah Gul, holds the office of Chairman Tehreek-e-Jawanan Pakistan and Kashmir (TJP). His daughter Uzma is the Chairperson Jammu Kashmir Solidarity Movement & Pak Kashmir Women Alliance.

Death

Hamid Gul suffered a haemorrhagic stroke in Murree.  According to reports, he had been suffering from high blood pressure and headaches for some time. His death was condoled by Former Prime Minister Nawaz Sharif, Former Chief of Army Staff Raheel Sharif, Former Chief of Army Staff Ashfaq Parvez Kayani, Imran Khan and other high officials. Gul is buried at the army cemetery in Westridge, Rawalpindi.

Among his possessions was a piece of the Berlin Wall, gifted to him by the Germans for "delivering the first blow" to the Soviet Union.

Awards and decorations

Books
Īfāʼe ʻahd (ايفائے عهد), Lahore : ʻIlm va ʻIrfān Publishers, 2012, 192 p. An account of various political changes in Pakistan; struggles of various forces to destabilize Pakistan and its security. Arranged by Mubīn G̲h̲aznavī.
Ek Janral se inṭarviyū (ايک جنرل سے انٹرويو), Lahore : ʻIlm va ʻIrfān Publishers, 2013, 200 p. Collection of interviews arranged by Mubīn G̲h̲aznavī.

References

External links

Profile of Hamid Gul, Pakistanileaders.com website. Retrieved 16 August 2015
Afghan war portraits taken by photographer Declan Walsh of Getty Images, Gul's home in Rawalpindi, The Guardian Newspaper, 25 July 2010. Retrieved 16 August 2015
Stein, Jeff. "The audacity of Hamid Gul." The Washington Post. 26 July 2010.
"Gulled by Hamid Gul." The Washington Times. Friday 4 December 2009.
Hamid Gul, the spy who went into the cold 2007 interview with Hamid Gul, the spy who went into the cold

Bibliography
 Zahid Hussain. Frontline Pakistan: The Struggle with Militant Islam, New York: Columbia University Press, 2007.
 Husain Haqqani. Pakistan: Between Mosque and Military, Washington, D.C.: Carnegie Endowment for International Peace, 2005.

1936 births
2015 deaths
Directors General of Inter-Services Intelligence
Government College University, Lahore alumni
Guerrilla warfare theorists
Military government of Pakistan (1977–1988)
Pakistan Military Academy alumni
Pakistani generals
Pakistani Sunni Muslims
Pashtun people
People from Rawalpindi
People from Sargodha District
Recipients of Hilal-i-Imtiaz
Spymasters
9/11 conspiracy theorists
Pakistani conspiracy theorists